Laura's Star is a 2004 German animated feature film produced and directed by . It is based on the children's book Lauras Stern by Klaus Baumgart. It was released by the German distribution unit of Warner Bros. Pictures and is one of the final known theatrical films officially released through the Warner Bros. Family Entertainment label (WBFE's final film overall was 2007's Tom and Jerry: A Nutcracker Tale, which was direct-to-video).

Plot
Laura is a seven-year-old country girl who just moved with her family to a big city. On her first night in her new neighborhood, she sees a shooting star falling to Earth. Laura finds the star in a park and discovers that it is a living being. The star has severed one of its points during its crash landing. Laura takes the star back home in order to reattach its point with a Band-Aid.

Laura and her younger brother Tommy discover the little star has superpowers and can do amazing things, such as making people fly and bringing inanimate objects to life. However, over time, both notice that the longer the star stays on Earth, the weaker it becomes; its color gradually fades and its powers fail. The siblings and their next-door neighbor Max eventually find a way to send the little star back into outer space.

Cast
 Céline Vogt as Laura
 Sandro Iannotta as Tommy
 Maximilian Artajo as Max
 Brit Gülland as Mama
 Heinrich Schafmeister as Papa
 Mirco Nontschew as Mechanical Cat / Bear
 Martin Reinl as Mini Rabbit
 Eva Mattes as Sun
 Peter Fitz as Moon
 Mogens von Gadow as Caretaker
 Hildegard Krekel as Cleaning Woman
 Adrian Wilms as Harry
 Carolin Von der Gröben as Harrys Bande
 Adrian Killian as Harry's Gang Member
 Tobias Klausmann as Harry's Gang Member

Music
The film features the songs "Stay" and "Touch the Sky" by the German band Wonderwall and a film score by Hans Zimmer, Nick Glennie-Smith, and Henning Lohner.

Release
The production was one of the most popular German animated films of 2004, and it has become the most successful animated film in all German film history. Warner Bros. also produced an English version of the movie, which was released in the United Kingdom and the United States the same year.

Accolades
 Outstanding Children or Youth Film, German Film Awards, 2005
 Adult Jury Prize – Animated Feature Film or Video, Chicago International Children's Film Festival, 2005

Sequels

In September 2009, Warner Bros. released a sequel, Lauras Stern und der geheimnisvolle Drache Nian, (Laura's Star and the Mysterious Dragon Nian), and in October 2011, another sequel, titled Lauras Stern und die Traummonster (Laura's Star and the Dream Monsters).

References

External links

 
 
 
 
 
 

2004 films
2000s German animated films
2004 animated films
Animated films based on children's books
Films scored by Nick Glennie-Smith
Films scored by Hans Zimmer
Animated films about extraterrestrial life
German animated films
German children's films
German independent films
Fiction about stars
Fiction about superhuman features or abilities
Warner Bros. animated films
Warner Bros. films
2000s American films
2000s German films